Eudarcia alanyacola is a moth of the family Tineidae. It is found in Turkey.

The wingspan is about 5 mm. The forewings are dark-brown with numerous cream scales, but without a clear pattern. The hindwings are grey.

Etymology 
The species is named after the locality where the holotype was collected.

References

Moths described in 2011
Meessiinae